The Liermo shooting occurred November 27, 1980 when Ángel Solana killed 7 people and wounded 1 in the , Spain.

Shooting
On the evening of November 27, 1980 in Liermo, Ángel Solana left his home. He took a shotgun, ammunition, put on a yellow raincoat. It was cold and raining then. He walked to the main street of Liermo. He greeted one of the neighbors and shot him. Then he went to the house of the chairman of the district council. He shot the head of the district council and his brother in the house. His daughter and grandchildren ran away from home. He then shot the wife of the district council chairman in a meadow near the house as she fled. He went to look for another neighbor. In a neighbor's house he found his wife, he asked her where her husband was. He found it on the farm. He shot him at his wife's cries. Then he went to look for another neighbor. He found him and his brother and shot them both. He also shot the woman and wounded her in the neck and face. After that he went to the cemetery in Langre. There he climbed into an excavated grave and shot himself in the jaw. After the shooting, he was wanted by the Civil Guard. Residents of Liermo and surrounding villages sat at home. His body was found accidentally on November 30. An autopsy found that he had shot himself on the night of November 28. His watch stopped at 2:30.

Perpetrator
Ángel Campo Solana, 64 lived in Liermo with his wife and children. He moved to Liermo a few years before the shooting. The municipality and the district council decided to build a playground on the land used by Solana. The land did not belong to anyone. Solana used this area for livestock, storage of various things. After the decision to build a playground was made, members of the district council and the Civil Guard demanded that the site be cleared. Solana refused to clean it because he considered it his own. The investigation found that Solana's first main goals were three members of the district council. Their relatives were accompanying victims. Then the main goals were members of the Veci family, due to quarrels and personal animosity. He shot them last. Due to the fact that the victims' houses were located far from each other, and the fact that in those parts someone often hunted with a shotgun, no one could understand what was happening. Solana was also a hunter and was often seen with a shotgun. His family wanted to buy the grave in which he shot himself, but could not, and he was buried in a nearby grave.

References

1980 mass shootings in Europe
Spree shootings in Spain
1980 murders in Spain